This is a list of places on the Victorian Heritage Register in the City of Latrobe in Victoria, Australia. The Victorian Heritage Register is maintained by the Heritage Council of Victoria.

The Victorian Heritage Register, as of 2021, lists the following nine state-registered places within the City of Latrobe:

References 

Latrobe
+